Mulu Ayar Bera is an Indian politician and a Minister of State and Member of Legislative assembly from Bhanvad constituency in Gujarat for its 12th legislative assembly. He was from Jamkhambhaliya and at the age of 26 he became the minister of Gujarat government. In 2022 Gujarat legislative assembly elections he defeated Ishudan Gadhvi of AAP and also Vikaram Madam of Indian National Congress. In this time he received total support from Pimal Nathvani of Reliance Industries. He became the minister of Gujarat Government and allotted the portfolio of Tourism, Forest and Environment .

References

Living people
Bharatiya Janata Party politicians from Gujarat
Year of birth missing (living people)
Gujarat MLAs 1995–1998
Gujarat MLAs 1998–2002
Gujarat MLAs 2002–2007
Gujarat MLAs 2007–2012